Alexander Muñoz (born February 8, 1979) is a Venezuelan professional boxer who has held the WBA super flyweight title twice; from 2002 to 2004, and from 2007 to 2008. He also challenged for the WBA bantamweight title in 2010. Muñoz's strong punching power earned him the nickname of "El Explosivo"; to date, 79% of his wins have come via knockout.

Boxing career 
Munoz had an outstanding amateur career, compiling a record of 163 wins, 9 losses, and 129 knockouts in 172 bouts. Not to be confused with a former amateur boxer of the same name from Puerto Rico.

Munoz turned professional in 1998 and captured the WBA super flyweight title with an 8th-round TKO win over Celes Kobayashi in 2002. He defended the title three times before losing by a split decision to Martín Castillo on December 3, 2004.

He recaptured the belt on May 3, 2007, with a unanimous decision win over Nobuo Nashiro. On January 14, 2008, Muñoz defended his belt by against Katsushige Kawashima, a former WBC super flyweight champion, in a similar way.

On May 17, 2008, Muñoz lost to WBC champion Cristian Mijares via a split decision in a unification bout. Mijares then became WBA super champion.

Professional boxing record

External links 
 

1979 births
Living people
People from Miranda (state)
Super-flyweight boxers
World Boxing Association champions
World boxing champions
Venezuelan male boxers